John Albert Gregory (9 September 1878 – 22 January 1955) was a Canadian politician, serving in municipal, provincial and federal governments. He was born in Exeter, Ontario and became a businessman and school principal by career. His father, Thomas Gregory, had been principal of the high school in Exter.

After attending schools in Exeter, Goderich and London, he moved to western Canada for law studies.

For twelve terms, he was mayor of the community of North Battleford, Saskatchewan. Gregory was also a Liberal member of the Legislative Assembly of Saskatchewan from 1934 to 1940 at The Battlefords provincial riding.

He was first elected as a Liberal party candidate for the House of Commons at The Battlefords riding in the 1940 general election. After serving one term in the House of Commons, Gregory was defeated by Max Campbell of the Co-operative Commonwealth Federation in the 1945 federal election.

References

External links
 

1878 births
1955 deaths
Liberal Party of Canada MPs
Mayors of places in Saskatchewan
Members of the House of Commons of Canada from Saskatchewan
People from Huron County, Ontario
Saskatchewan Liberal Party MLAs
People from North Battleford